The Warsaw Society of Friends of Science (TPN) was one of the earliest Polish scientific societies, active in Warsaw from 1800 to 1832.

Name
The Society was also known as Warszawskie Królewskie Towarzystwo Przyjaciół Nauk (Warsaw Royal Society of Friends of Learning). Sometimes the word "Royal" was omitted.

History

Though the Society was founded in 1800, its traditions harked back to the Thursday dinners that had been held in the final decades of the 18th century by Poland's last king, Stanisław August Poniatowski. From 1824 the Society was headquartered in the Staszic Palace (after its renovation in 1820–23), purchased for the Society by one of its most prominent members, Stanisław Staszic. In 1828 the Society had 185 members.

The Society flourished in the Duchy of Warsaw and Congress Poland, but was eventually dissolved by the Russian authorities in the aftermath of the failed November Uprising of 1830–31, when many Polish cultural organizations were delegalized as part of the repressions. The Society's traditions were continued by the Warsaw Scientific Society (Towarzystwo Naukowe Warszawskie).

Influence
The Society was an important part of the second half of the Enlightenment in Poland, preserving Polish culture and science after the partitions of Poland damaged the fledgling Polish education system (after the world's first ministry of education, the Komisja Edukacji Narodowej - Polish for Commission of National Education - was abolished, many schools were closed and Germanization and Russification begun). The Society gathered Polish scientists, academics, writers and their sponsors throughout partitioned Poland; many of whom met twice in month in Warsaw for discussions. The creation and activities of the Society had a very significant impact on the development of science in Poland. It supported various scientific pursuits, from research, through creation of museums and libraries, organizing various events to supporting education and publishing. The society sought to popularize learning and shape intellectual and artistic trends, it also had a very broad membership.

After the Załuski Library had been removed by the Russians to St. Petersburg, the Society's library was the greatest public library in former Poland. Its collection was partially confiscated by the Russians in 1832, and later parts of it were destroyed by the Nazis during the Second World War. It had its own journal, the Annals of the Warsaw Society of Friends of Learning (Roczniki Warszawskiego Towarzystwa Przyjaciół Nauk, vols. 1-21, published 1802–30), and the Warsaw Chronicle (Pamiętnik Warszawski), a serious monthly modeled on publications such as the Edinburgh Review.

While some Society members  studied the history of Poland (Joachim Lelewel) or the Polish language (Samuel Linde), others implement new inventions and spread ideas of the Industrial Revolution. Staszic was responsible for substantial improvements in mining, Tadeusz Czacki worked at regulating rivers, and others applied engineering or medicine.

After the Warsaw Society was disbanded in 1832, organizations in other cities began using analogous names, e.g., the Poznań Society of Friends of Learning.

Notables

Presidents:
Jan Chrzciciel Albertrandy (1800–1808)
Stanislaw Staszic (1808–1826)
Julian Ursyn Niemcewicz (1826–1832)
Members:
Jerzy Samuel Bandtkie
Feliks Bentkowski
Tadeusz Czacki
Jan Niepomucen Janowski
Hugo Kołłątaj
Onufry Kopczyński
Jan Kossakowski
Michał Dymitr Krajewski
Onufry Kopczyński
Samuel Linde
Joachim Lelewel
Krzysztof Celestyn Mrongovius
Józef Maksymilian Ossoliński
Stanisław Kostka Potocki
Johann Christian Schuch
Fryderyk Skarbek
Jan Śniadecki
Jędrzej Śniadecki
Abraham Stern
Ignacy Zaborowski

See also
Poznań Society of Friends of Learning
Academy of Sciences
Polish Academy of Sciences (headquartered in Warsaw)
Polish Academy of Learning (headquartered in Kraków)

Notes

References
Warsaw Society of the Friends of Science entry at Scholarly Societies Project
 Entry in PWN Encyklopedia
 Entry in WIEM Encyklopedia
 Entry in Encyklopedia Internautica

External links
 Warsaw Scientific Society web page 

Organizations established in 1800
Organisations based in Warsaw
1832 disestablishments
Polish educational societies
Buildings and structures in Warsaw
Education in Warsaw
History of Warsaw
1800s in science
1800 in science
1800 in Poland
Scientific societies based in Poland